Michael Brandon Lake is an American Christian worship singer, songwriter and worship pastor. Lake is a member of the Maverick City Music collective, and serves as a worship pastor at Seacoast Church in Charleston, South Carolina. Lake began his recording career with a successful crowdfunding campaign to produce an album in 2015, which resulted in the independent release of his debut studio album, Closer, in 2016.

Lake signed with Bethel Music in January 2019, and made his debut on the record label by releasing his version of Tasha Cobbs Leonard's hit single "This Is a Move". Due to his contributions as a songwriter on "This Is a Move", Lake received the GMA Dove Award Gospel Worship Recorded Song of the Year in the 2019 GMA Dove Award. "This Is a Move" also earned Lake his first Grammy Award nomination for Best Gospel Performance/Song in the 2020 Grammy Awards. In 2020, he released his second studio album House of Miracles, which contained the singles "I Need a Ghost" and "Just Like Heaven". House of Miracles peaked at number 12 on Billboard's Top Christian Albums chart in the United States. He also featured on Elevation Worship's hit single "Graves into Gardens" which became the first number one Hot Christian Songs chart single for both acts, and peaked at number two on the Bubbling Under Hot 100 chart in the United States. In 2021, Lake released the single "Too Good to Not Believe" alongside Bethel Music, as well as notable collaborations with Elevation Worship and Maverick City Music on "Talking to Jesus" and Chris Tomlin on "I See You". Lake also garnered seven nominations at the 2021 GMA Dove Awards, ultimately winning two: the GMA Dove Awards for Songwriter of the Year and Worship Recorded Song of the Year for "Graves into Gardens". 

In 2022, Lake released Help!,  his third studio album which is focused on discussing mental health. Help! debuted at number 18 on the Billboard Top Christian Albums chart in the United States. Lake released "Gratitude" as his third single from House of Miracles (2020), which went on to become his first solo Hot Christian Songs number one single. Lake also collaborated with Brooke Ligertwood on the single "Honey in the Rock" and with Maverick City Music, Kirk Franklin, and Chandler Moore on "Fear Is Not My Future".

Early life 
Brandon Lake grew up in Myrtle Beach, South Carolina, where his father was a pastor of a church plant. Lake developed a passion for playing the guitar in childhood, which was nurtured by his father who taught him to play a few basic chord progressions. Lake taught himself how to play the guitar using YouTube, learning songs by Third Day and Chris Tomlin. In his teenage years, Lake accompanied the worship team at his church and was later hired by Seacoast Church as a worship leader for their college ministry.

Career

2015–2019: Closer and Bethel Music signing
On April 15, 2015, Brandon Lake launched a GoFundMe crowdfunding campaign to raise $23,000 to produce a new album. The campaign was a success, with 101 donors pledging $23,100. In 2016, Lake made his career debut with the release of "Run to You", the lead single to his debut album, Closer. Lake independently released Closer on May 20, 2016. In 2018, Lake released "Pour Me Out" as a standalone single.

In January 2019, Lake joined the Bethel Music collective and subsequently signed to the record label. He was a member of Bethel Music's Victory Tour alongside Tasha Cobbs Leonard and Housefires. He made his debut on the label with the release of his version of Tasha Cobbs Leonard's hit "This Is a Move", which he had co-written, as a standalone single on June 28, 2019. "This Is a Move" became Lake's first charting single, peaking its debut at number 36 on Billboard's Hot Christian Songs chart. Lake received a 2019 GMA Dove Award for Gospel Worship Recorded Song of the Year due to his songwriting contribution on "This Is a Move" by Cobbs Leonard. "This Is a Move" also garnered a songwriting nomination at the 2020 Grammy Awards in the Best Gospel Performance/Song category for Lake.

2020–2021: House of Miracles
In early 2020, Lake was featured on several singles. The first collaboration single was Matt Redman's "We Praise You", released on January 11, 2020. On March 6, 2020, Bethel Music released a live rendition of "We Praise You" with Lake as the second single to Bethel's album, Revival's in the Air (2021). This was shortly followed by Lake's feature on Elevation Worship's "Graves into Gardens" released on March 13. "Graves into Gardens" debuted at number twelve on the Billboard Hot Christian Songs chart. "Graves into Gardens" went on to peak at number one on the Hot Christian Songs chart, becoming Lake's first chart-topping hit single. "Graves into Gardens" won the Billboard Music Award for Top Christian Song at the 2021 Billboard Music Awards.

On May 25, 2020, Bethel Music released the song "Come Out of that Grave (Resurrection Power)" with Lake as a promotional single. "Come Out of that Grave (Resurrection Power)" launched at number 38 on the Billboard Hot Christian Songs chart. On June 12, 2020, he was featured on Rebecca St. James' single, "Battle Is the Lord's". "Battle Is the Lord's" went on to debut at number 48 on the Billboard Hot Christian Songs chart.

On July 24, 2020, Lake released a new single titled "I Need a Ghost", as the lead single to his second studio album, House of Miracles, slated to be released in summer. "I Need a Ghost" debuted at number five on the Billboard Christian Digital Song Sales Chart. On August 14, 2020, Lake released "Just Like Heaven" as the second single from House of Miracles. "Just Like Heaven" peaked at number 36 on the Billboard Hot Christian Songs chart. On August 17, 2020, Lake announced that the album was slated for release on August 28. Subsequently, the album was released on August 28, 2020, containing the singles "I Need a Ghost" and "Just Like Heaven". The album peaked at number 12 on Billboards Top Christian Albums chart.

On January 22, 2021, Lake released his first live album, House of Miracles (Live), which contains live versions of some of the songs that initially appeared on House of Miracles studio recording, as well as new songs. The album debuted at number 29 on the Top Christian Albums Chart. On February 6, 2021, Lake released a five-track EP titled Almond Eyes on digital platforms, the EP being his surprise tenth anniversary gift to his wife, Brittany Lake. Lake featured on "Talking to Jesus" by Elevation Worship and Maverick City Music, which was released as the second promotional single to their collaborative live album, Old Church Basement (2021), on April 9, 2021. "Talking to Jesus" debuted at number nine on the US Hot Christian Songs chart and at number one on the Hot Gospel Songs chart, both dated April 22, 2021. Lake and Bethel Music released the song "Too Good to Not Believe" as a single on May 21, 2021. "Too Good to Not Believe" peaked at number 17 on the Billboard Hot Christian Songs chart. On August 6, 2021, Lake and Chris Tomlin released the song "I See You" as a single. "I See You" peaked at number 31 on the Billboard Hot Christian Songs chart.

Lake received seven nominations for the 2021 GMA Dove Awards, in categories such as New Artist of the Year, Songwriter of the Year, Rock/Contemporary Recorded Song of the Year for "I Need a Ghost," Song of the Year and Worship Recorded Song of the Year for his feature on "Graves into Gardens", and Long Form Video of the Year for House of Miracles (Live), and he won GMA Dove Award for the Songwriter of the Year and Worship Recorded Song of the Year for "Graves into Gardens".

2022–present: Help!
On March 25, 2022, Lake and Brooke Ligertwood released "Honey in the Rock" as a single to Christian radio in the United States. "Honey in the Rock" peaked at number seven on the Billboard Hot Christian Songs chart. On April 11, 2022, Brandon Lake announced his first headlining tour, dubbed the Miracle Nights Tour, joined by Blessing Offor and Joshua Silverberg as special guests and set to visit twelve cities in the United States during the fall of 2022. On May 13, 2022, Brandon Lake released his third studio album, Help!, via Tribl Records. Help! is a concept album centered on mental health. Help! debuted at number 18 on the Top Christian Albums Chart. Lake released the radio version of "Gratitude" on June 3, 2022, making it the third and final single from House of Miracles (2020). "Gratitude" peaked at number one on the Hot Christian Songs chart, marking his first number one single on the chart as a lead artist.

Lake received five nominations at the 2022 GMA Dove Awards, being nominated for Songwriter of the Year – Artist, songwriting nominations in the Song of the Year category for "Rattle!" by Elevation Worship and Rock/Contemporary Recorded Song of the Year category for "I Need You" by Gable Price and Friends, as well as producer nominations in the Contemporary Gospel Album of the Year and Christmas/Special Event Album of the Year categories for Maverick City Music albums Jubilee: Juneteenth Edition (2021) and A Very Maverick Christmas (2021), respectively.

On October 28, 2022, Lake and KB released "Graves" as a single. "Graves" peaked at number 33 on the Billboard Hot Christian Songs chart. On November 4, 2022, Lake featured on the radio version of "Fear Is Not My Future" released by Maverick City Music and Chandler Moore. "Fear Is Not My Future" peaked at number 13 on the Billboard Hot Christian Songs chart. On November 14, 2022, Lake announced the spring 2023 leg of the Miracle Nights Tour, with Benjamin William Hastings joining him as a special guest, spanning twelve cities across the United States.

Personal life 
Lake and Brittany Schneider married in 2011. They have two sons and, in February 2022, announced that a third child was due in August.

Discography 

 Closer (2016)
 House of Miracles (2020)
 Help! (2022)

Filmography

Tours 
Headlining
 Singalong Tour with Phil Wickham and Pat Barrett (2021)
 Miracle Nights Tour (2022)
 Summer Worship Nights Tour with Phil Wickham (2023)

Supporting
 Victory Tour with Bethel Music (2019)
 Chris Tomlin, Kari Jobe, Bethel Music Live in Concert (2021)
 Elevation Nights Tour with Elevation Worship and Steven Furtick (2022)
 Kingdom Tour with Maverick City Music and Kirk Franklin (2022)

Awards and nominations

ASCAP Christian Music Awards 

!
|-
| 2021
| "Graves into Gardens"
| Award winning Christian songs
| 
| 
|-
| 2022 
| "Rattle!"
| Award winning Christian songs
| 
| 
|-
|}

Billboard Music Awards 

!
|-
| 2021
| "Graves into Gardens"
| Top Christian Song
| 
| 
|-
|}

GMA Dove Awards 

!
|-
| 2019
| "This Is a Move (Live)"
| Gospel Worship Recorded Song of the Year
| 
| 
|-
| rowspan="7" | 2021
| rowspan="2" | Brandon Lake
| Songwriter of the Year
| 
| rowspan="7" | 
|-
| New Artist of the Year
| 
|-
| rowspan="2" | "Graves into Gardens"
| Song of the Year
| 
|-
| Worship Recorded Song of the Year
| 
|-
| "I Need a Ghost"
| Rock/Contemporary Recorded Song of the Year
| 
|-
| "Tumbas A Jardines"
| Spanish Language Recorded Song of the Year
| 
|-
| House of Miracles (Live)
| Long Form Video of the Year
| 
|-
| rowspan="5" | 2022
| "Rattle!"
| Song of the Year
| 
| rowspan="5" | 
|-
| Brandon Lake
| Songwriter of the Year - Artist
| 
|-
| "I Need You"
| Rock/Contemporary Recorded Song of the Year of the Year
| 
|-	
| Jubilee: Juneteenth Edition 
| Contemporary Gospel Album of the Year
| 
|-
| A Very Maverick Christmas 
| Christmas/Special Event Album of the Year
| 
|-
|}

Grammy Awards 

!
|-
| 2020
| "This Is a Move (Live)"
| Best Gospel Performance/Song
| 
| rowspan="10" | 
|-
| rowspan="4" | 2022
| "Wait on You"
| Best Gospel Performance/Song
| 
|-
| "Jireh"
| Best Contemporary Christian Music Performance/Song
| 
|-
| Jubilee: Juneteenth Edition
| Best Gospel Album
| 
|-
| Old Church Basement
| Best Contemporary Christian Music Album
| 
|-
| rowspan="5" | 2023
| "Kingdom"
| Best Gospel Performance/Song
| 
|-
| "Fear Is Not My Future"
| rowspan="2" | Best Contemporary Christian Music Performance/Song
| 
|-
| "God Really Loves Us (Radio Version)"
| 
|-
| Kingdom Book One Deluxe
| Best Gospel Album
| 
|-
| Breathe
| Best Contemporary Christian Music Album
| 
|-
|}

See also 
 List of Christian worship music artists

Notes

References

External links 
 

1990 births
Living people
Christians from South Carolina
American male singer-songwriters
American performers of Christian music
Composers of Christian music
People from Charleston, South Carolina
21st-century American singers
21st-century American male singers
Singer-songwriters from South Carolina
Grammy Award winners